The men's 4 x 100 metres relay events at the 2011 IPC Athletics World Championships were held at the QEII Stadium on 24, 27 and 29 January

Medalists

T11−13
The Men's 4 x 100 metres relay, T11−13 was held on January 24 and 27

T11−13
T11 = visual impairment - range from no light perception, to light perception with the inability to recognise the shape of a hand.  
T12 = recognise the shape of a hand, have a visual acuity of 2/60 and/or visual field of less than 5 degrees.
T13 = visual acuity ranges from 2/60 to 6/60, and/or visual field of over 5 degrees and less than 20 degrees.

Results

Heats

Qualification: First 4 fastest(q) advance to the final.

Key:  q = qualification by overall place, DQ = Disqualified, R 163.3 = Leaving the lane, R 170.14 = Passing of the baton outside the take-over zone

Final

T35−38
The Men's 4 x 100 metres relay, T35−38 was held on January 27

T35−38
T35 = good at keeping balanced while still, problems in keeping balance while moving. A shift of centre of gravity may lead to loss of balance. May need assistive devices for walking, not when standing, may have sufficient lower extremity function to run.  
T36 = walk without assistance or assistive devices, have more control problems with their upper than lower limbs. All four limbs are involved, dynamic balance is often better than static balance. 
T37 = spasticity in an arm and leg on the same side, good functional ability on the non impaired side, better development, good arm and hand control, walk without assistance. 
T38 = meet the minimum disability criteria for athletes with cerebral palsy, head injury or stroke. A limitation in function that impacts on sports performance.

Results

Final

Key:  DQ = Disqualified, CR = Championship Record, AR = Area Record, R 170.14 = Passing of the baton outside the take-over zone

T42−46
The Men's 4 x 100 metres relay, T42−46 was held on January 29

T42−46 = Athletes with amputations or equivalent impairments.

Results

Final

Key:  DQ = Disqualified, CR = Championship Record

See also
List of IPC world records in athletics

References
General
Schedule and results, Official site of the 2011 IPC Athletics World Championships
IPC Athletics Classification Explained, Scottish Disability Sport
Specific

External links
ParalympicSport.TV on YouTube
2011 IPC Athletics World Championships: Men's 4x100m T42-T46

Relay 4 x 100 metres
4 × 100 metres relay at the World Para Athletics Championships